Richard North may refer to:

 Richard B. North, American medical doctor
 Richard D. North (born 1946), British conservative commentator
 Richard A. E. North (born 1948), British blogger and author
 Richard North (darts player) (born 1990), English darts player
 Richard Alan North (born 1944), British biomedical scientist
 Richard North Patterson (born 1947), American author